The 2007 1000km of Nürburgring was the third round of the 2007 Le Mans Series season.  It took place on 1 July 2007, at the Nürburgring, Germany.

Official results
Class winners in bold.  Cars failing to complete 70% of winner's distance marked as Not Classified (NC).

† - #59 Team Modena was disqualified for failing post-race inspection.  The car has a fuel tank larger than regulations allowed.

Statistics
 Pole Position - #7 Team Peugeot Total - 1:41.867
 Fastest Lap - #7 Team Peugeot Total - 1:44.046
 Average Speed - 166.384 km/h

References

External links
 Le Mans Series - Nürburgring
 World Sports Racing Prototype - 1000 km of Nürburgring results

N
6 Hours of Nürburgring
Nurburgring